Evelyn Adiru (born 25 May 1964) is a former Ugandan middle-distance runner who specialised in 800 metres, and 1500 metres events. She won gold medal in 800 metres at the 1982 African Championships in Athletics in Cairo. She also competed for Uganda in the 1984 Summer Olympics in the same event, but did not progress to the finals.

Adiru was a member of the University of Alabama track and field team from 1984 to 1989. Later, she settled in Ontario, Canada with her Ugandan husband. Adiru's daughter, Sura Yekka, is a member of the University of Michigan women's soccer team and the Canadian women's national soccer team.

Achievements

References

External links

1964 births
Living people
Ugandan female middle-distance runners
Athletes (track and field) at the 1982 Commonwealth Games
Commonwealth Games competitors for Uganda
Olympic athletes of Uganda
Athletes (track and field) at the 1984 Summer Olympics
World Athletics Championships athletes for Uganda
African Games bronze medalists for Uganda
African Games medalists in athletics (track and field)
Athletes (track and field) at the 1987 All-Africa Games
Alabama Crimson Tide men's track and field athletes
Ugandan expatriate sportspeople in the United States
Ugandan emigrants to Canada
20th-century Ugandan women
21st-century Ugandan women